Joshua Paul Bell (born January 8, 1985) is an American professional football defensive backs coach for the Toronto Argonauts in the Canadian Football League (CFL). He played defensive back for nine years in the National Football League (NFL) and the CFL. He was originally signed by the San Diego Chargers as an undrafted free agent in 2008. He played college football at Baylor.

Bell has also been a member of the Denver Broncos, Green Bay Packers, BC Lions, and Calgary Stampeders.

Professional career

San Diego Chargers
After going undrafted in the 2008 NFL Draft, Bell was signed by the San Diego Chargers as an undrafted free agent. He was released on August 30.

Denver Broncos
Bell was signed to the practice squad of the Denver Broncos on September 24, 2008. He was promoted to the active roster on October 27 after an injury to cornerback Champ Bailey. In his rookie season, Bell appeared in nine games (five starts) and recorded 34 tackles and four pass deflections. He was waived/injured and subsequently placed on injured reserve on September 4, 2009. On September 10, 2009 the Broncos reached an injury settlement with Bell and released him.

Green Bay Packers
On November 23, 2009, the Green Bay Packers signed Bell after losing Al Harris to a season-ending injury.
On August 10, 2010, Bell was placed on Injured Reserve.

BC Lions
Bell signed with the BC Lions on May 22, 2012 and played with the club for two seasons. In his first season in BC Bell only saw limited playing time on both defense and special teams. In his second year in the CFL, Bell recorded 45 tackles and 1 interception.

Calgary Stampeders
On February 12, 2014, Bell signed as a free agent with the Calgary Stampeders, reuniting him with former defensive coordinator, Rich Stubler. Bell started all 18 games at defensive back for the Stamps in the 2014 CFL season. He finished the season with 56 tackles, 2 special teams tackles and 2 interceptions. On February 26, 2015 Bell and the Stamps agreed to a contract extension.

Bell announced his retirement as a player on February 1, 2018.

Coaching career

Calgary Stampeders
On the same day that he retired as a player, Bell joined the Calgary Stampeders' staff as the new defensive backs coach for the 2018 season. In his first year as a coach, he won his second Grey Cup championship following a Stampeders win in the 106th Grey Cup game. Following the cancelled 2020 CFL season, Bell was not retained by the Stampeders for 2021 due to the league-mandated football operation cap.

Toronto Argonauts
On May 14, 2021, it was announced that Bell had joined the Toronto Argonauts as the team's defensive backs coach.

References

External links
 Calgary Stampeders bio 
 Green Bay Packers bio
 Baylor Bears bio 

1985 births
Living people
African-American players of American football
African-American players of Canadian football
American football cornerbacks
Baylor Bears football players
BC Lions players
Calgary Stampeders players
Calgary Stampeders coaches
Denver Broncos players
Green Bay Packers players
Players of American football from Dallas
Players of American football from Los Angeles
Players of Canadian football from Dallas
Players of Canadian football from Los Angeles
San Diego Chargers players
Toronto Argonauts coaches